Alma Bella is a female Peruvian cumbia group that was created in 2000.

Biography 
This musical group has 10 years of artistic life. During this time, the group has always been a leader among women's groups in Peru. Almost 200 songs recorded summarize the successful career of Alma Bella.

Topics such as: Bombon asesino, Mermelada, Evidencias, Atrévete, Me ilusioné, Aventura, Amiga Mía, Dile, Lejos de Ti, Me Engañaste, Mi Delirio, many other successes have made this group in not only the audience favorite but also Peru abroad.

United States, Spain, Italy, Switzerland, Sweden, Costa Rica, Bolivia, Argentina, Chile and others permanently enjoy the artistic merits of this female quintet.

Current members 

Emily Vargas, 
Veronica Privat
Shirley Mendoza
and Yolanda Medina.

Hits 

  Reina de la cumbia
  Mermelada
  Bombón Asesino
  Atrévete
  Aventura
  Evidencias
  Amor entre mujeres
  Malo Malo
  Mentiroso

References 

Peruvian musical groups
Latin American girl groups
Peruvian women singers
Cumbia musical groups
Musical groups established in 2000
Women in Latin music